Ford Fry (born June 17, 1969) is an American chef and restaurateur based in Atlanta, Georgia. His team consists of 13 restaurants in Georgia, three restaurants in Houston, two in Charlotte and two in Nashville. Collectively, he owns 23 restaurants across America.  Fry's portfolio of restaurants includes JCT. Kitchen & Bar, no. 246, The Optimist, King + Duke, St. Cecilia, The El Felix, Superica, Marcel State of Grace, BeetleCat, and La Lucha. Several of Fry's restaurants have received various accolades. In October 2015, CBS This Morning described Fry as "one of the most prolific chefs and restaurateurs" in the United States. In March 2021, Atlanta Eats dubbed Fry "a peerless restaurateur with many beloved brands."

Biography 
Fry was raised in Texas and in his early life he studied at the New England Culinary Institute in Vermont. He then worked as a chef in fine dining in the U.S. states of Florida, Colorado, California, and Georgia. In January 2007, he based himself in Atlanta and opened his first restaurant, the JCT. Kitchen & Bar. Fry currently resides in Roswell, Georgia, with his wife and two sons. In his spare time, he enjoys playing guitar and spending time with his family.

Accolades 
Fry was a semifinalist for the 2013, 2014, 2015, 2016, and 2017 James Beard Foundation Outstanding Restaurateur Award. Eater Atlanta named Fry as the "Empire Builder of the Year" in 2013, and Fry also won the Georgia Restaurant Association's seventh annual Crystal of Excellence (GRACE) Award for Restaurateur of the Year in 2013.

The Optimist restaurant was selected as Esquire magazine's Best New Restaurant of the Year in 2012.
Fry has been asked to cook at the James Beard house numerous times. and Condé Nast Traveler named the restaurant one of the 50 best new restaurants in the world. Bon Appetit magazine named it the #7 best new restaurant in America in 2013. Esquire magazine named King + Duke restaurant as one of the best new restaurants of 2013.

In 2017 the firm that designed St. Cecilia, Meyer Davis, won the James Beard award for Outstanding Restaurant Design in North America (76 seats and over).

References

Further reading
 
 

American chefs
American male chefs
American restaurateurs
Living people
1969 births
People from Texas